Andreas Dionysiou Liveras (1935 – 26 November 2008) was a Cyprus-born British businessman, who rose from modest means to own and run successful bakery and yacht charter companies. He held British and Cypriot citizenship and was killed during Mumbai attacks of November 2008.

Biography
Liveras was the first of nine children born to a shepherd in Kyrenia, Cyprus.

In 1963 Liveras immigrated with his family to the Kensington district of London, where he took a job selling pastries and driving a delivery truck at the Fleur de Lys bakery. He bought the company five years later, expanding it to become one of the largest frozen cake manufacturers in Europe, then sold it to Express Dairies in 1985. He spent his gain on yachts, among other things, starting Liveras Yachts, a company based in Monte Carlo that owns and rents boats for private charter.

In 1992 Liveras and his son Dionysios started Laurens Patisseries in London, later moving the company to Newark-on-Trent in Nottinghamshire. The family built Laurens to become one of the largest cream-filled pastry producers in the UK. The company was bought in 2006 by the Icelandic Bakkavör Group for £130 million.

Liveras was killed by terrorists on 26 November 2008 at the Taj Mahal Hotel during the November 2008 Mumbai attacks, where he had gone for a meal, shortly after he gave an interview to the British Broadcasting Corporation. As of his death he had four children, and was ranked 265th on The Sunday Times Rich List of the wealthiest people in the United Kingdom.

A widower, he is survived by three daughters and a son, all of whom live in London.

References

External links
 laurens.co.uk - Laurens Patisseries official site
 liverasyachts.com - official site

1935 births
2008 deaths
Cypriot emigrants to England
Deaths by firearm in India
British terrorism victims
20th-century British businesspeople
Victims of the 2008 Mumbai attacks
Naturalised citizens of the United Kingdom